Chaurjahari  is a Municipality in Western Rukum District in Karnali Province of Nepal that was established in 2015 through the merging the two former Village development committees Bijayaswori and Kotjahari. It lies on the bank of Sani Bheri River. At the time of the 2011 Nepal census it had a population of 27,438 people living in 5,422 individual households.

Demographics
At the time of the 2011 Nepal census, 99.0% of the population in Chaurjahari Municipality spoke Nepali, 0.8% Magar, 0.1% Hindi and 0.1% Urdu as their first language.

In terms of ethnicity/caste, 45.7% were Chhetri, 15.0% Kami, 14.2% Magar, 10.0% Hill Brahmin, 4.5% Thakuri, 3.8% Sarki, 2.6% Damai/Dholi, 2.5% Sanyasi/Dasnami, 1.0% Badi and 0.7% others.

In terms of religion, 97.5% were Hindu, 1.8% Buddhist, 0.5% Christian and 0.2% Muslim.

Transportation  
Chaurjahari Airport lies in Old-Bijayashwari.

References

Populated places in Western Rukum District
Municipalities in Karnali Province
Nepal municipalities established in 2015